"Run, Run, Run" is a 1964 song written by Holland–Dozier–Holland and released as a single by Motown singing group The Supremes. After a couple of years of unsuccessful singles, the Supremes had finally broken through with a Top 40 single (23) in December 1963 with "When the Lovelight Starts Shining Through His Eyes". On the heels of its release, Motown rush-released a second HDH single titled "Run, Run, Run". Inspired by the sounds of Phil Spector and his Wall of Sound, it was an attempt to give the Supremes a poppier sound compared to their earlier heavy R&B recordings. Billboard described the song as a "strong follow up" to "When the Lovelight Starts Shining Through His Eyes," stating that it "has tough beat in a middle up groove that's great for dancing." Cash Box described it as "a pulsating, big sounding rocker with some torrid triplet keyboard work backing up."

The single peaked at number 93 on the Billboard Hot 100 and number 22 on the Cash Box R&B chart. The Supremes would eventually escape the shadow of their so-called "no-hit" past with their next single "Where Did Our Love Go".

Personnel
Lead vocals by Diana Ross
Background vocals by Florence Ballard, Mary Wilson, Holland–Dozier–Holland and The Four Tops
Instrumentation by The Funk Brothers

Chart history

References

1964 singles
1964 songs
The Supremes songs
Songs written by Holland–Dozier–Holland
Song recordings produced by Brian Holland
Song recordings produced by Lamont Dozier
Song recordings with Wall of Sound arrangements
Motown singles